In the mathematical fields of topology and K-theory, the Serre–Swan theorem, also called Swan's theorem, relates the geometric notion of vector bundles to the algebraic concept of projective modules and gives rise to a common intuition throughout mathematics: "projective modules over commutative rings are like vector bundles on compact spaces".

The two precise formulations of the theorems differ somewhat. The original theorem, as stated by Jean-Pierre Serre in 1955, is more algebraic in nature, and concerns vector bundles on an algebraic variety over an algebraically closed field (of any characteristic). The complementary variant stated by Richard Swan in 1962 is more analytic, and concerns (real, complex, or quaternionic) vector bundles on a smooth manifold or Hausdorff space.

Differential geometry 
Suppose M is a smooth manifold (not necessarily compact), and E is a smooth vector bundle over M. Then Γ(E), the space of smooth sections of E, is a module over C∞(M) (the commutative algebra of smooth real-valued functions on M). Swan's theorem states that this module is finitely generated and projective over C∞(M). In other words, every vector bundle is a direct summand of some trivial bundle:  for some k. The theorem can be proved by constructing a bundle epimorphism from a trivial bundle  This can be done by, for instance, exhibiting sections s1...sk with the property that for each point p, {si(p)} span the fiber over p. 

When M is connected, the converse is also true: every finitely generated projective module over C∞(M) arises in this way from some smooth vector bundle on M. Such a module can be viewed as a smooth function f on M with values in the n × n idempotent matrices for some n. The fiber of the corresponding vector bundle over x is then the range of f(x). If M is not connected, the converse does not hold unless one allows for vector bundles of non-constant rank (which means admitting manifolds of non-constant dimension). For example, if M is a zero-dimensional 2-point manifold, the module  is finitely-generated and projective over  but is not free, and so cannot correspond to the sections of any (constant-rank) vector bundle over M (all of which are trivial).

Another way of stating the above is that for any connected smooth manifold M, the section functor Γ from the category of smooth vector bundles over M to the category of finitely generated, projective C∞(M)-modules is full, faithful, and essentially surjective. Therefore the category of smooth vector bundles on M is equivalent to the category of finitely generated, projective C∞(M)-modules.

Topology 
Suppose X is a compact Hausdorff space, and C(X) is the ring of continuous real-valued functions on X. Analogous to the result above, the category of real vector bundles on X is equivalent to the category of finitely generated projective modules over C(X). The same result holds if one replaces "real-valued" by "complex-valued" and "real vector bundle" by "complex vector bundle", but it does not hold if one replace the field by a totally disconnected field like the rational numbers.

In detail, let Vec(X) be the category of complex vector bundles over X, and let ProjMod(C(X)) be the category of finitely generated projective modules over the C*-algebra C(X). There is a functor Γ : Vec(X) → ProjMod(C(X)) which sends each complex vector bundle E over X to the C(X)-module Γ(X, E) of sections. If  is a morphism of vector bundles over X then  and it follows that

giving the map 

which respects the module structure . Swan's theorem asserts that the functor Γ is an equivalence of categories.

Algebraic geometry
The analogous result in algebraic geometry, due to  applies to vector bundles in the category of affine varieties.

References 

.
.
.

.

Commutative algebra
Theorems in algebraic topology
Differential topology
K-theory